Mosque-Sabil of Sulayman Agha al-Silahdar or Mosque-Sabil-Kuttab of Sulayman Agha al-Silahdar is a complex of mosque, sabil and kuttab established during the era of Muhammad Ali Pasha in Islamic Cairo, the historic medieval district of Cairo, Egypt. It is located at the beginning of Burjouan alley of the famed Muizz Street. On the other side it faces the extension of Al-Nahasin Street leading to the Bab Al-Shaareya square.

History
The building dates back to 1839.

Description

The mosque consists of a rectangle divided into two sections. The western section contains sanctuary area of the mosque and a sahn which is surrounded by a four-sided hallway covered by small domes built on marble pillars. Each dome is decorated with multicolored oil paintings with floral and geometric patterns and Qur'anic inscriptions. The sahn is covered by wooden roof with a center opening for ventilation, lighting and protection of the mosque from rain. The eastern section contains a prayer room and consists of two pillars, each of which contains two marble columns. The two sections divide the place of prayer into three corridors parallel to the qibla wall. The place of prayer is covered by a wooden ceiling decorated with multicolored oil paintings. The qibla wall is in the prayer room and marble mihrab can be found on the center of it.

The mosque was renovated in 2015 by the grandson of Suleiman Agha al-Silahdar.

The sabil is located next to the adjacent kuttab. It is adorned with Ottoman Baroque style facade strongly resembles that of Sabil of Ismail Pasha.

Interior 
The interior Mosque Sabil of Sulayman Agha Al-Silahdar tends to be divided into two sections and the sections are divided in a form of a rectangular structure. The mosque is a focal ideal of the Ottoman style architecture which depicts the style of the characteristics of the Muhammad Ali architectural design.  The Facade consists of floral designs in which replicates the European Renaissance architecture, and so are the granite structures which consists of oil paintings throughout the interior of the ceilings. The ornamental architecture of the facade of Sabil Sulyiman Agha Al-Silahadar is made of white marble and is embellished with Turkish calligraphy that reflects the Ottoman style. In terms of the Sabil, it was formed of marble, which was used to keep the temperature of the water cool.

The outside area of the shattered forum structure is disguised with the shallow arches in the Ottoman Architecture. Just above the entryway of the mosque there is a tiny round balcony. The sacred structure of the roof is supported by various identical marbled walls that construct three columns corresponding to the qibla wall. The Dika is a form of artwork that involves the wooden archways that are above the entryway, interacting with the small spherical rooftop on the outside. The Columns of the interior of the mosque is surrounded by oblong windows that reflects the natural lighting in the inside coming from the courtyard. The inside of the interior of the Dome consisted of the different designs of the flowers in which had the Quranic inscriptions in the inside.

Exterior 
Throughout the exterior of Sulayman Agha Al-Silahdar's mosque the Sabil, is a charity fountain that was developed to provide free water to walkers seeking to get close to god in Islam. The Sabil was constructed on busy streets and not residential streets for a reason: to provide a huge proportion of the people passing by which provides a better use of the Sabil. The Sabil had an entry on the outside that was different from the mosque's entry. For example, the minaret on the exterior of the Sulayman Agha Al-Silahdar's, "an especially elegant shaft, tall, slender and cylindrical with elongated conical top stands between the madrasa and the mosque. The minaret included just a single balcony with longitudinal carvings.

See also

 Lists of mosques
 List of mosques in Africa
 List of mosques in Egypt
 List of Historic Monuments in Cairo

References

External links

 Government Website of Islamic artifacts

Religious buildings and structures completed in 1839
Mosque buildings with domes
19th-century establishments in Egypt
Mosques in Cairo
19th-century religious buildings and structures in Egypt